State Road 552 (NM 552) is a  state highway in the US state of New Mexico. NM 552's western terminus is at the end of state maintenance southwest Logan, and the eastern terminus is at U.S. Route 54 (US 54) south of Logan.

Major intersections

See also

References

552
Transportation in Quay County, New Mexico